Han Chang-woo (韓 昌祐, born February 15, 1931) is a Zainichi Korean businessman who is the CEO of the pachinko management company, .

Early life
Han was born in Korea and secretly entered Japan in October 1945. He obtained Special Permanent Resident status and attended Hosei University, graduating with a degree in economics in 1952.

Career
Shortly after graduation, he took over a pachinko operation run by his brother-in-law in Kyoto. He founded Maruhan Corporation in 1972. Han became a Japanese national in 2002.

Philanthropy
He has announced that he intends to give away his entire fortune to foster Korean and Japanese relations before he dies. More recently he has pledged to up his culture fund based in Japan to 140 billion won and an education fund in Korea to 10 billion won.

Awards
Order of the Sacred Treasure, Third Class - 1999
Sacheon Citizen Award (사천시민대상) - 2010

Controversy
A lawsuit was filed in September 2020 in the U.S. Territory of Guam alleging that he had unlawfully taken away $300 million in stock owned by one of his daughters. The Suit also claims that Han Chang-Woo's motivation for this action was to force his daughter to divorce her second husband, an African-American businessman and retired pro basketball player.

See also
Masayoshi Son, another Zainichi Korean businessman

References

External links
  한창우 마루한그룹 회장은 누구?
  Naver Profile
 English Profile

1931 births
Japanese people of South Korean descent
Naturalized citizens of Japan
People from South Gyeongsang Province
Living people
Japanese billionaires
South Korean billionaires
20th-century Japanese businesspeople
21st-century Japanese businesspeople
Hosei University alumni